Dalymount Park (Irish: Páirc Chnocán Uí Dhálaigh) is a football stadium in Phibsborough on the Northside of Dublin, Ireland.

It is the home of Bohemian F.C., who have played there since the early 20th century. Affectionately known as Dalyer by fans, it was also historically the "home of Irish football", holding many Irish internationals and FAI Cup finals. It has also hosted UEFA Champions League qualifiers, UEFA Cup and UEFA Cup Winners' Cup matches. However, the ground was largely undeveloped between the 1940s and the 2000s, and has now fallen out of use as a major venue, except for the home games of Bohemians.

The ground has also been used as a home ground by other League of Ireland teams, including Shamrock Rovers, Dublin City F.C. and Sporting Fingal. While it was also proposed in 2016 that Shelbourne F.C. would share the ground, by 2022 Shelbourne had proposed instead to purchase and remain at Tolka Park.

History

Early years
Dalymount Park was originally common land with a large vegetable plot and known as Pisser Dignam's Field until it was taken over by Bohemian F.C. It hosted its first game on 7 September 1901, between Bohemians and Shelbourne F.C. and in front of an attendance of around 5,000. Harold Sloan scored the first ever goal at the ground in a 4–2 win for Bohs. On that day, it was just an ordinary field enclosed by a corrugated iron fence, the playing pitch being separated from the spectators by a roped barrier and a tent at one end served as dressing rooms for the players.

Within a few weeks, paling had replaced the ropes and the line of demarcation between "reserved" and "unreserved" was fixed by a 6 ft high hoarding. An "unreserved" entrance was then erected at the Connaught Street side. A small wooden stand to the east of the reserved entrance soon appeared as did a similar stand behind each goal.

Dalymount was chosen as the venue for the Irish Cup Final in 1903 between Bohemians and Distillery and on 26 March 1904, it hosted its first international, a game which saw Ireland play Scotland in a 1–1 draw, between 1904 and 1913 Dalymount hosted at least one Irish international in the years when Ireland had more than one home match in the British Home Championship.

By the 1907/08 season, the ground had been considerably widened, large wooden stands were erected behind both goals, another was built in the centre of the "popular" side and in the reserved enclosure an additional wooden stand appeared to the west of the entrance. Over the following years, the main stand on the reserved side was roofed and a similar addition made on the unreserved side.

In 1915, Dalymount hosted the IFA Intermediate Cup final when UCD beat Portadown 2-1.

Huge improvements happened to the ground during the 1927/28 season; the galvanised iron boundary was replaced by a 10 ft wall having 20 turnstile houses and entrance and exit gates at a cost of £2,520. A new steel stand was erected in the reserved enclosure and provision was made for fitting out club rooms, offices, etc. when more money was available. Entrance to the stand was by steps placed at points along the front and facing the field of play. This stand cost £5,833. Other additions included an iron railing along the pitch on the reserved side, new banking on both reserved and unreserved sides and a gymnasium and kicking alley.

Within a few years, the Bohemian F.C. committee engaged the services of famous Scottish architect Archibald Leitch (he had designed many of the most famous grounds in England and Scotland) who drew up plans for future building of Dalyer. Another section was added to the reserved stand, new entrances and exits were placed at the rear. More banking and terracing around the entire pitch were completed, crush barriers erected and new stile houses installed (bringing the total to 28). This new work meant that between 1925/26 and 1932, a total of £17,000 had been spent on upgrading the stadium.

"Glory years"
In its heyday, Dalymount Park, or "Dalyer" as it is popularly known, regularly saw crowds of up to 40,000 for big games, however, whether it was ever able to accommodate this number of spectators safely is open to question. The stadium consisted of three sides of open terracing, one side the "Shed End" or "School End" being partly covered with a roof over half the terrace since 1945. The fourth side was the main stand, which held only 1500 seats. The stand was constructed in 1928 from iron and wood, with wooden benches and terraced standing room at the front. The floodlights that adorn Dalymount Park once thought to have stood at Arsenal's old stadium, were in fact built in Scotland. The lights were funded through what we would now refer to as crowd funding and inviting some of the bigger teams over. Initial notices suggested that the lights would be in place by September 1961, which was then extended to October and ultimately until February of 1962. In the words of Club Secretary Andy Kettle, as quoted by Ryan Clarke in his recent series on Dalymount, it also meant that Bohs could “invite many top clubs to Dublin from time to time”.

The first of which ended up being Arsenal, though they weren’t first choice. But before these glamour matches could be paid Kettle had to deal with some level of internal dissent from Bohs members about the level of expenditure and even had to engage in a little bit of what might be termed “crowdfunding” in the modern parlance. Kettle elaborated in the Dublin Evening Mail that the club had “approached their bankers, the Munster and Leinster Bank, their members, players, traders, FAI and League of Ireland for financial assistance”, before adding “Bohs are keeping open their fund and will only be to happy to receive any further contributions. No matter how small…”The inaugural floodlit match saw Arsenal beat Bohemians 3-8.

Dalymount's record attendance was put at 48,000, for an Irish international game against England on 19 May 1957. A similar crowd attended the first entry of an Irish team into the European Cup, when Shamrock Rovers played Manchester United in 1957. The record attendance at the venue for an FAI Cup Final is 45,000, achieved when Shamrock Rovers beat Bohs in 1945. The ground saw the international debuts of players such as Liam Brady, Johnny Giles and Denis Irwin.

Decline
However, by the 1980s, Dalymount had been sidelined by the more modern and larger Lansdowne Road rugby union ground for Irish football internationals. Parts of the ground had also become somewhat dilapidated, some of terracing was in bad shape – with grass growing on it in places – and one access route to the ground (behind the old "Tramway End") had been cut off completely. In February 1985, when Ireland played the then World Champions, Italy, at Dalymount Park, it was clear that the old ground could not accommodate the 40,000 or so spectators who turned up to see the game. Fans had to be passed down to the sidelines to avoid being crushed and serious questions were raised about whether Dalymount was a viable venue for modern sport. After a safety review, the capacity of the stadium was cut in half to only 22,000. Thereafter, Dalymount only rarely hosted senior internationals and rarer still competitive ones. The last full Irish international game to be played there was friendly against Morocco in 1990. Dalymount also lost the FAI Cup Final in 1990, when it was switched to Lansdowne Road. It briefly recovered the final in 1996, when it held the replayed final between Shelbourne and St Patrick's Athletic and in 1997 and 1998, when it hosted Cup Final again. However, in 1999, the final was switched to Tolka Park and in 2003 back to Lansdowne Road. Even when Landsdowne was being redeveloped in 2006 to 2010, Dalymount was not considered suitable to host the Cup Final, which was held at the Royal Dublin Society stadium in 2007 and 2008 and Tallaght Stadium in 2009.

Redevelopment
Bohemians have redeveloped the ground to some extent. In 1999 the old main stand was replaced by a modern structure with 2742 seats, known as the "Jodi Stand". This was at a cost of £1.1 million. This new structure replaced the 90-year-old wooden stand and at the time was meant to be phase one of the redevelopment of Dalymount Park.

Half of the terrace on the opposite side was knocked down, the remainder had seats installed on the terracing and held 3720 but has no roof cover which limited its use until it was closed for health and safety reasons in 2011. The old "Shed End", now called "The Des Kelly Carpets Stand" has similarly had seats added and now has a capacity of 1485 and is now commonly used as an away section. The terrace behind the opposite goal (or "Tramway End") has been sold and is also therefore closed, leaving the ground with only two operational sides. The current capacity of the stadium is therefore reduced to just 4,227.
Bohs' average crowd is about 2,000. There is no designated stand for away fans with traveling support accommodated in different stands depending on the numbers expected. The more vocal Bohemians fans meanwhile, gather at the western end of the main stand.

Shamrock Rovers also played the 2005 season at Dalymount Park, as did the now defunct team Dublin City F.C. in 2006, who drew very low crowds. Galway United director Nial O'Reilly claimed to have seen "52 spectators at the match" when his club played away to Dublin City.

The stadium has also been used to host European games of other teams when their own stadia were deemed unsuitable, such as Drogheda United's Champions League qualifiers and UEFA Cup games of 2006, 2007 and 2008. Shamrock Rovers played their first 11 European games at Dalymount as Milltown was deemed too small at the time.

Sporting Fingal played their Europa League match against Portuguese side C.S. Maritimo at the stadium as Fingal's new ground had yet to be completed. In December 2010, Sporting Fingal announced that they were to play their home games at Dalymount during the 2011 Airtricity League season however, the club folded less than two months later.

Dalymount hosted a game in the 2011 UEFA Regions' Cup between Ligue de Normandie of France and Abruzzo of Italy.
In the 2016 domestic league season, tenants Bohemian F.C. drew an average home league attendance of 1,480.

Abandoned development plans
On 4 May 2006, Bohemian FC members voted to authorise the club's board's entry into negotiations which would have resulted in the sale of the Dalymount Park site to property developer Liam Carroll and the demolition of the ground itself. Bohemians would have relocated to a purpose built (at a projected cost of €21 million, to be met by the developer) 10,000 seats stadium near Dublin Airport off the M50 motorway, four miles from the club's current home. On 7 November 2008, Bohemian F.C. lost a court case versus Albion Ltd over the ownership of a section of Dalymount Park at the Tramway End of the ground which put the contract with Liam Carroll in serious doubt.

However, in late 2009, the owner of Albion Ltd offered to build the new stadium for Bohs at the site and give Bohs €23 million in return for Dalymount Park, with the company redeveloping the site with houses and expansion of the nearby Phibsborough Shopping Centre. Given the collapse of the Irish property sector, this did not happen.

Council purchase and proposed groundshare
Dublin City Council announced in March 2015 that it would purchase Dalymount Park in a deal including the taking back of Tolka Park which it has been leasing to Shelbourne F.C. The council completed the purchase in June 2015 for €3.8million. It was hoped that Bohemians and Shelbourne would become joint sub-tenants to the Football Association of Ireland at Dalymount, and that the ground could be redeveloped. It was proposed that Bohemians, the council and the stadium would emerge from the deal "debt-free". The Dalymount deal went ahead despite issues with the Tolka Park acquisition.

While it was announced in October 2016 that Shelbourne FC would be moving in, by February 2022, Shelbourne proposed the purchase of Tolka Park, and the cancellation of the plan to share Dalymount.

Council redevelopment proposals
In October 2018, the council published plans for the redevelopment of the stadium into a 6,000-seater UEFA Category 3 facility. The council had published preliminary plans in 2016 to demolish and rebuild Dalymount on a phased basis at a cost of €20 million. The work was contingent on works on the neighbouring Phibsborough Shopping Centre site, which was controlled by the National Asset Management Agency. A related deal was concluded in February 2019. It was suggested that Bohemians and Shelbourne would need to play elsewhere during redevelopment. Government funding of €900,000 was announced in February 2020, with Bohs set to play in Tolka Park. Tolka Park may remain in operation according to Dublin City Council.

As of mid-2022, the development plans had not progressed, and "scaled back" options were under consideration by the council, "amid rising cost concerns".

In August 2022 demolition of the Connaught Street Stand began.

In October 2022, the council published its updated redevelopment plans, with a proposed capacity of 7,880, and a completion date of 2026.

Notable games

Irish international matches
Irish international matches held at Dalymount Park have included:

Cup finals 
Dalymount has hosted many cup finals before partition of Ireland it hosted six Irish Cup (Irish Football Association) finals and two replays, it also has hosted the Irish Free State Cup final and is successor the FAI Cup final on numerous occasions. A number of cross border cup competition finals were hosted in Dalymount such as the Blaxnit Cup and Dublin and Belfast Intercity Cup.

Other uses
Dalymount Park has hosted live music in the past, most notably the only Irish concert by Bob Marley and the Wailers on 6 July 1980. On 21 August 1977, Dalymount hosted the first rock concert by Thin Lizzy and the Boomtown Rats and was profiled in Hot Press magazine. It hosted Status Quo in 1979.

In 2001, a planned Destiny's Child concert was moved from the venue when safety inspectors found it to be unsuitable.

In 2015 Dalymount Park hosted Shamrock Bowl XXIX for the IAFL between the Belfast Trojans and Trinity College Dublin American Football.

See also
 Stadiums of Ireland

References

External links
 Bohemian FC official website
 Dalymount Park
 Video Stadium tour 
 Stadium Guide Article

Association football venues in the Republic of Ireland
Bohemian F.C.
Republic of Ireland national football team home stadiums
Sports venues in Dublin (city)
Shamrock Rovers F.C.
Shelbourne F.C.
Association football venues in County Dublin